Gabriel Fourmigué (23 March 1967 – 4 July 2022) was a French bobsledder who competed in the early 1990s. Competing in two Winter Olympics, he earned his best finish of eighth in the four-man event at Albertville in 1992. He was murdered along with a 32 year-old French teacher on 4 July 2022 in Pouyastruc, Hautes-Pyrénées.

References

 1992 bobsleigh four-man results
 1994 bobsleigh four-man results

External links

1967 births
2022 deaths
Bobsledders at the 1992 Winter Olympics
Bobsledders at the 1994 Winter Olympics
French male bobsledders
Olympic bobsledders of France
Sportspeople from Gers
Deaths by firearm in France